Micah Boyd (born April 6, 1982) is a male crew rower who qualified for the eight-man rowing competition of the 2008 Summer Olympics in Beijing, competing for the United States.

Early years
Boyd began rowing at the Minnesota Boat Club; where he learned to scull in a double with his identical twin brother, Anders Boyd.

In the summer of 2000, Micah and his brother Anders were invited to the U.S. Junior National Team selection camp, but Micah declined selection to one of the large boats to row the double with his brother, eventually losing at trials.

At the 2000 Royal Canadian Henley Regatta, Micah placed second in the Junior (under 19) men's double scull event against future U.S. team teammates Sam Stitt and Giuseppe Lanzone.

Micah wears a distinctive Minnesota Twins cap during some races and graduated from the University of Wisconsin in Natural Resources.  The 6'3" twin is a two-time national team member who won the pair at the first 2008 National Selection Regatta. He also won a bronze medal at the 2005 World Rowing Championships as well as the bronze medal in the 2008 Summer Olympics in Beijing.

Micah rowed for the University of Wisconsin from Fall of 2000 to Spring of 2004.  From 2004 to 2005 Micah served as the Freshman Assistant Coach, reporting to Freshman Coach Eric Mueller.  During this time Micah competed in the annual Mantathalon, a grueling three event race designed to push athletes to their limits and beyond.

Micah now lives near Sandy, Utah.

He now coaches the Waterford High School crew team.

References

Living people
1982 births
University of Wisconsin–Madison alumni
Rowers at the 2008 Summer Olympics
Olympic bronze medalists for the United States in rowing
American male rowers
Medalists at the 2008 Summer Olympics
World Rowing Championships medalists for the United States